The Gulf, Mobile and Northern Railroad Rebels were lightweight, streamlined diesel-electric trains built by  American Car and Foundry. The third train, purchased in 1937, allowed service to be added between Jackson and Mobile, Alabama. Unlike other earlier diesel streamliners, these trains were not articulated, as their normal operation required adding and removing cars from the consist.

The units had an uncommon 2-B wheel arrangement, mounted atop a pair of road trucks. The aft section was divided into two separate compartments: one was used to transport baggage and the other served as a small railway post office, or RPO (the forward door, located just behind the radiator louvers, was equipped with a mail hook).

Two of these power cars, numbered 352 and 353, were purchased as part of the 1935 order, along with three buffet-coach cars, and two sleeper-observation cars. Normal operating procedure was for a northbound train to leave New Orleans with two coaches and an observation car. Due to lower ridership on the northern portion of the route, one of the 2 coaches would be removed from the northbound train at Jackson, Mississippi, and the train would continue on to Jackson, Tennessee as a 3 car consist. The southbound train would add the extra coach during its own stop at Jackson, Mississippi.

The 1937 order included a third power car, and 2 coach-sleepers. This third power car was numbered 354, and though it had additional air intakes in the carbody, mechanically it was identical to the other two.  It ran from Mobile, to Union, Mississippi with a single coach-sleeper, which was added to the northbound mainline train from New Orleans. It then returned to Mobile with the coach-sleeper from the southbound train.  Due to low ridership and wartime exigencies, this run was cut off on April 28, 1942.

While the original Rebel served New Orleans and Jackson, after the merger of the GM&N and Mobile and Ohio to create the Gulf, Mobile and Ohio Railroad in 1942, the trains route was extended to St. Louis.  At this time, it was converted to full-sized equipment hauled by DL-105 locomotives (see ALCO DL-109) which were also styled by Otto Kuhler.

The powercars were scrapped in 1962.

See also
 List of ALCO diesel locomotives
 FM OP800, similar St. Louis Car Company built railcars, powered by Fairbanks-Morse
 Seaboard Air Line 2027 & 2028, similar St. Louis Car Company built railcars, powered by EMD

Footnotes

References

 
 

2-B locomotives
Rebel power cars
American Car and Foundry Company
North American streamliner trains
Scrapped locomotives
Passenger trains of the Gulf, Mobile and Ohio Railroad
Named passenger trains of the United States
Railway locomotives introduced in 1935
Diesel locomotives of the United States
Night trains of the United States